The 1896–97 season was Manchester City F.C.'s sixth season of league football and fifth season in the Football League.

Team Kit

Football League Second Division

Results summary

Reports

FA Cup

Squad statistics

Squad
Appearances for competitive matches only

Scorers

All

League

See also
Manchester City F.C. seasons

References

External links
Extensive Manchester City statistics site

1896-97
English football clubs 1896–97 season